Cruises Creek is a stream in Boone and Kenton counties, Kentucky, in the United States. It is a tributary of the Licking River.

Cruise Creek was named for Captain Cruise, an explorer who was killed near the stream in 1784.

See also
List of rivers of Kentucky

References

Rivers of Boone County, Kentucky
Rivers of Kenton County, Kentucky
Rivers of Kentucky
Licking River (Kentucky)